Idrus Shaban Abdulahi (born 22 September 2003) is an Australian professional soccer player who plays as a midfielder for Brunswick City SC.

Early life
Abdulahi was born in Ethiopia and came to Australia aged seven.

Club career

Melbourne City
Abdulahi made his City debut as a second-half substitute in the final game of the 2018–19 season against Central Coast Mariners, replacing Dario Vidosic in the 81st minute. In doing so, he became Melbourne City's youngest ever player at the age of 15 years, 7 months and 4 days.

On 9 September 2019, Abdulahi signed a two-year scholarship deal with the club.

International career
On 2 October 2019, Abdulahi was selected in the Joeys squad for the 2019 FIFA U-17 World Cup. He played in all of the Joeys' Group B games, playing the full 90 minutes against Hungary and Nigeria as they progressed to the Knockout stage. He started in their Round of 16 clash with France on 7 November 2019, losing 4-0 and being eliminated from the competition.

References

External links

2003 births
Living people
Australian soccer players
Association football midfielders
Melbourne City FC players
A-League Men players
National Premier Leagues players